William C. McGee (born February 21, 1936 in King, North Carolina) is a former Republican member of the North Carolina General Assembly representing the state's 75th House district, including constituents in Forsyth county. McGee is a retired stockbroker from Clemmons, North Carolina.

Electoral history

2010

2008

2006

2004

2002

References

|-

1936 births
Living people
People from King, North Carolina
Democratic Party members of the North Carolina House of Representatives
21st-century American politicians